Liang Jing  (born 4 January 1985) is a Chinese track cyclist.  At the 2012 Summer Olympics, she competed in the Women's team pursuit for the national team.

Achievements
  2011-2012 Track Cycling World Cup in Astana - Team pursuit

References

1985 births
Living people
Chinese female cyclists
Chinese track cyclists
Olympic cyclists of China
Cyclists at the 2012 Summer Olympics
People from Binzhou
21st-century Chinese women